Medrano is a gender-neutral Spanish surname of Basque origin that means "abundance". It is the surname of high nobility established in the old Kingdom's of Navarre, Aragon, Castile, France, etc. It may refer to:

People
 Luisa de Medrano, The first female professor in Spain
 Gabino Gainza Fernandez de Medrano, Captain General of Chile and Guatemala, declared and headed the First Independent United States of Central America
 Carlos Monge Medrano, Peruvian physician
 Diego Medrano, Spanish poet, narrator and columnist
 Enric Casadevall Medrano, Andorran politician
 Francisco Medrano (footballer), Salvadoran football player
 Francisco Medrano (poet), Spanish poet
 Giovanni Antonio Medrano, Italian architect under the reign of King Charles III of Spain
 Héctor Medrano, Mexican football manager
 Íngrid Medrano, Salvadoran wrestler
 José Alberto Medrano, Salvadoran general
 Jose Domingo Medrano, Salvadoran doctor
 Juan de Espinosa Medrano, Peruvian author
 Orlando Montenegro Medrano, Nicaraguan president
 Pedro Medrano, Argentine statesman and lawyer
 Rosa Medrano, Dominican volleyball player
 Vivienne Medrano, American animator and voice actress
 Medrano Tamen, Cameroonian footballer

Places
 Medrano, Spain, a municipality in La Rioja, Spain
 Juan Espinoza Medrano District, a district in Peru
 Medrano (Buenos Aires Underground), a metro station in Argentina

Entertainment and media
 Cirque Medrano, a Famous French circus
 General Medrano, a character in Quantum of Solace
 Lily Medrano, a character in Gaano Kadalas ang Minsan